Elephant ear may refer to:

 The ear of an elephant

Plants
 Several genera in the family Araceae (Arums)
 Alocasia, genus of broad-leaved perennials in tropical & subtropical Asia to Eastern Australia
 Caladium, ornamental plants with arrowhead-shaped leaves originally from South America
 Colocasia (taro), a genus of flowering plants native to tropical Polynesia and southeastern Asia
 Xanthosoma, a genus native to tropical America cultivated for their starchy corms
 Burdock, a thistle in the genus Arctium
 Bergenia crassifolia or other plants in genus Bergenia, shade-loving flowering garden plant

Other uses
 Another name for one of several desserts, including a palmier and fried dough
 Gynandrocarpa placenta, genus Gynandrocarpa, a colonial ascidian, sea squirt, found off the Cape Peninsula, South Africa
 Smoke deflectors on steam locomotives may be called "elephant ears" in US railway slang

See also
 Elephant ear sponge (disambiguation)
 Elephant ear tree, Enterolobium cyclocarpum or Macaranga gigantea